Gabriel Veron Fonseca de Souza (born 3 September 2002), known as Gabriel Veron, is a Brazilian professional footballer who plays for FC Porto as a winger.

Club career
Born in Assu, Rio Grande do Norte, Veron joined Palmeiras' youth setup in 2017, from local side Santa Cruz de Natal. In June of the following year, he was the top goalscorer and the best player of the Mundial de Clubes de La Comunidad de Madrid Sub-17, helping the under-17 squad lift their first international trophy.

On 14 November 2018, Veron signed his first professional deal with Verdão, until 2021. Roughly one year later, after returning from international duty, he agreed to a pre-contract until 2024, active on his 18th birthday.

Veron made his first team – and Série A – debut on 28 November 2019, coming on as a second-half substitute for Willian in a 1–0 away loss against Fluminense. On 5 December, after coming on only in the second-half, he scored twice and provided an assist to Dudu in a 5–1 home routing of Goiás; by doing so, he became the second-youngest player to score for the club. Veron is also the youngest player to score in a Libertadores match.

On 22 July 2022 Veron was announced as the new number 7 for his current team Porto for a reported amound of 10.25 million euros.

International career
Already a regular at Brazil under-17s, Veron was included in Guilherme Dalla Déa's 21-man list for the 2019 FIFA U-17 World Cup on 20 September 2019. An undisputed starter during the competition, he contributed with three goals as his side lifted the trophy for the fourth time, and was subsequently awarded the Golden Ball.

Career statistics

Club

Honours
Palmeiras
 Campeonato Paulista: 2020, 2022
 Copa do Brasil: 2020
 Copa Libertadores: 2020, 2021
 Recopa Sudamericana: 2022
 Campeonato Brasileiro: 2022

Porto
 Supertaça Cândido de Oliveira: 2022

Brazil U17
 FIFA U-17 World Cup: 2019

Individual
 FIFA U-17 World Cup Golden Ball: 2019

References

External links

Profile at the FC Porto website

2002 births
Living people
Sportspeople from Rio Grande do Norte
Brazilian footballers
Association football forwards
Campeonato Brasileiro Série A players
Sociedade Esportiva Palmeiras players
Brazil youth international footballers